Extended Versions is a series of discounted live albums published by BMG Special Products starting in the late 1990s.  To date, there have been over 100 albums released in this series.

List of Extended Versions albums
Extended Versions (10,000 Maniacs album), 2009
 Extended Versions (38 Special album), 2000
Extended Versions (Asia album), 2007
 Extended Versions (Bad Company album), 2010
Extended Versions (Barenaked Ladies album), 2006
 Extended Versions (Big Star album), 2004
Extended Versions (Cinderella album), 2006
Extended Versions (Deep Purple album), 2000
 Extended Versions (Emerson, Lake & Palmer album), 2000
Extended Versions (Europe album), 2007
Extended Versions (Everclear album), 2011
 Extended Versions (The Fixx album), 2000
Extended Versions (Foreigner album), 2005
Extended Versions (Great White album), 2004
Extended Versions (Humble Pie album), 2000
 Extended Versions (Jethro Tull album), 2006
Extended Versions (Little Feat album), 2000
 Extended Versions (Lou Reed album), 2003
 Extended Versions (Loverboy album), 2009
 Extended Versions (Lynyrd Skynyrd album), 1998
 Extended Versions, (Benny Mardones album), 2006
 Extended Versions (Megadeth album), 2007
Extended Versions (The Monkees album), 2003
 Extended Versions (Motörhead album), 2002
Extended Versions (Ted Nugent album), 2005
 Extended Versions (The Outlaws album), 2002
 Extended Versions (Overkill album), 2002
Extended Versions (Queensrÿche album), 2007
 Extended Versions (REO Speedwagon album), 2001
Extended Versions (Ringo Starr album), 2003
Extended Versions (Stryper album), 2003
Extended Versions (Styx album), 2000
 Extended Versions (Todd Rundgren album), 2001
Extended Versions (Triumph album), 2006
 Extended Versions (Yes album), 2002

References

Live album series
2000s live albums